The Queen of Spain fritillary (Issoria lathonia) is a butterfly of the family Nymphalidae.

Subspecies
Subspecies include:
Issoria lathonia lathonia
Issoria lathonia isaea (Gray, 1846) (Himalaya, Yunnan)
Issoria lathonia messora (Fruhstorfer, 1909) (China)
Issoria lathonia isaeoides Reuss, 1925 (Sichuan, China)

Distribution and habitat

This migratory species is widespread in most of Europe, in North Africa, Canary Islands, and in the eastern Palearctic realm (Central Asia, Himalayas, Baluchistan, and Western China). These butterflies live in open areas, in dry lawns, agricultural wastelands and in extensive crops at altitudes between sea level and 2700 m.

Description
The wings show a deep orange-violet background, with rounded black spots arranged in regular rows and suffused with greenish gray in the females. The underside of the hindwings is decorated with large pearly nacreous spots and it is crossed by a postdiscal row of black eyespots with pearly pupils. Some pearly spots also appear at the apex of the forewings.

It is grayish brown, with black spots, and relatively short brown spines with white tip, and a double row of dorsal white streaks. The suspended chrysalis is dark brown, with a large white saddle-shaped stain and some smaller ones of the same color, resembling a bird's dropping.

The imago is loosely similar to Speyeria aglaja, Fabriciana adippe and Brenthis daphne, which have the same orange color on the upperside of the wings, but show different markings and spots. Moreover, the underside of the hindwings does not have the large pearly spots characteristic of the Queen of Spain fritillary.

Biology

This species is present almost throughout the year, with three or four successive generations. The eggs are laid separately on the underside of the leaves of the host plant. The larval cycle is exceptionally short. The pupation takes place among the low vegetation, between a few leaves united by silk. This species may overwinter at all larval stages.

Adults are strong flyers and fly from March to October. The heat-dependent caterpillars feed on Viola species (wild pansy or heartsease (Viola tricolor), field pansy (Viola arvensis), Viola canina, Viola odorata, Viola calcarata, Viola lutea, Viola biflora), lucerne (Medicago sativa), borage (Borago officinalis), Anchusa, Rubus and Onobrychis species.

In the dry regions Issoria lathonia carries out a seasonal vertical migration between hardy evergreen shrubs and small trees of plains and mountain fir pines, where it remains in summer to descend in autumn at low altitude.

Bibliography

.

References

External links

 Lepi Net - Les Carnets du Lépidoptériste Français
 UK Butterflies

Issoria
Butterflies of Asia
Butterflies of Europe
Butterflies described in 1758
Taxa named by Carl Linnaeus